Zhang Shunfang (born 16 June 1966) is a Chinese sailor. She competed in the Europe event at the 1992 Summer Olympics.

References

1966 births
Living people
Place of birth missing (living people)
Chinese female sailors (sport)
Olympic sailors of China
Sailors at the 1992 Summer Olympics – Europe